Simon Bouknight House is a historic home located at Batesburg-Leesville, Lexington County, South Carolina. It was built in 1890, and is a one-story, weatherboarded Victorian cottage under a gabled roof. It has a gabled projecting central porch supported by four regularly spaced slender wood posts; front and end gables with cornice returns and centered, diamond-shaped windows; and corbeled chimneys. The house is set on a lattice brick foundation.

It was listed on the National Register of Historic Places in 1982.

References 

Houses on the National Register of Historic Places in South Carolina
Victorian architecture in South Carolina
Houses completed in 1890
Houses in Lexington County, South Carolina
National Register of Historic Places in Lexington County, South Carolina